Richard Ducommun (July 3, 1952 – June 12, 2015) was a Canadian stand-up comedian, actor, writer and producer.

Career
One of his earliest television appearances was on Star Search and as a technician accosted by a scantily-clad dancer near the end of the music video for O'Bryan's song "Lovelite", both in 1984.  He finished second in the comedy category behind Brad Garrett.
His credits include Bart (half of Biff and Bart) in the Canadian children's TV series Zig Zag, Rick Dukeman in the music video show Rock 'N' America, Tom Hanks' neighbor Art Weingartner in The 'Burbs (1989), the villainous monster "Snik" in the Fred Savage fantasy Little Monsters (1989), a barfly in the Bill Murray comedy Groundhog Day (1993), and Henry the chauffeur in Blank Check (1994).

Ducommun acted in other films, such as No Small Affair (1984), A Fine Mess (1986), Spaceballs (1987), Die Hard (1988), The Experts (1989), The Hunt for Red October (1990), Gremlins 2: The New Batch (1990), The Last Boy Scout (1991), Class Act (1992), Encino Man (1992), Last Action Hero (1993), Jury Duty (1995), Scary Movie (2000) and MVP: Most Valuable Primate (2000).

Ducommun died in June 2015 of complications from diabetes. He was 62.

Filmography

Rock 'N' America (1984) – Host
No Small Affair (1984) – Groom
A Fine Mess (1986) – Wardell
Spaceballs (1987) – Prison Guard
Die Hard (1988) – Walt, City Worker
The Experts (1989) – Sparks
The 'Burbs (1989) – Art Weingartner
Little Monsters (1989) – Snik
The Hunt for Red October (1990) – Navigator C-2A
The Earth Day Special (1990) - Hospital Security Guard
Gremlins 2: The New Batch (1990) – Clamp Center Security Guard
The Last Boy Scout (1991) – Pool Owner
Encino Man (1992) – Mr. Brush
Class Act (1992) – Parole Officer Reichert
Loaded Weapon 1 (1993) – District Attorney
Groundhog Day (1993) – Gus
Last Action Hero (1993) – Tom Noonan's Agent
Ghost in the Machine (1993) – Phil Stewart
Blank Check (1994) – Henry
Jury Duty (1995) – The Real Frank (uncredited)
Dogmatic (1999)
Final Voyage (1999) – Jasper
Scary Movie (2000) – Cindy's Dad
MVP: Most Valuable Primate (2000) – Coach Marlowe
Harvard Man (2001) – Police Officer Martino (uncredited)
Like Mike (2002) – Dad Outside Arena
Pauly Shore Is Dead (2003) – Mitch Rosenberg
Back by Midnight (2004) – Wilson
Funky Monkey (2004) – Father Rick (final film role)

References

External links

1952 births
2015 deaths
Canadian male comedians
Canadian male film actors
Canadian male television actors
Canadian television writers
Male actors from Saskatchewan
Writers from Prince Albert, Saskatchewan
Deaths from diabetes
Canadian male television writers
Canadian stand-up comedians
20th-century Canadian male actors
20th-century Canadian comedians
21st-century Canadian male actors
21st-century Canadian comedians
Comedians from Saskatchewan